Joseph Tumpach (December 7, 1912 – October 20, 1968) was an American businessman and politician.

Born in Baltimore, Maryland, Tumpach was a businessman and owned a motel. He was also involved with the CIO and was chairman of the DuPage County, Illinois Democratic Party. Tumpach lived in Downers Grove, Illinois. Tumpach served in the Illinois House of Representatives from 1965 until his death in 1968. Tumpach and his wife Cecelia were killed in an automobile accident, in Westmont, Illinois, as they were leaving a dinner for Tumpach at a union hall. Tumpach was seeking a third term in the Illinois General Assembly.

Notes

1912 births
1968 deaths
Politicians from Baltimore
People from Downers Grove, Illinois
Businesspeople from Illinois
Democratic Party members of the Illinois House of Representatives
Road incident deaths in Illinois
20th-century American businesspeople
20th-century American politicians